Laurence Roche (also written as Lawrence Roche) (born 15 October 1967 in Dublin) is a former professional Irish road racing cyclist. During that Tour, he raced on the same team as his famous brother, Stephen Roche. Stephen was disqualified on the second stage of the race after failing to make the time limit when he missed the start time of the team time trial. Several days later, Lawrence went on a long solo breakaway. Roche would finish his only tour in 153rd place. In 2002, he was back to racing after a two-year break and he won the Dunboyne 3 day race. In 2008, Roche competed in the FBD Insurance Ras.

References

External links
Profile on cycling website

1967 births
Living people
Irish male cyclists
Sportspeople from County Dublin